"Bonnie Jean (Little Sister)" is the debut single written and recorded by American country music artist David Lynn Jones.  It was released in August 1987 as the first single from the album Hard Times on Easy Street. The song reached number 10 on the Billboard Hot Country Singles & Tracks chart.

Content
The song is about a female truck driver, a single mother with three children to raise. (Early in the song, she was married, but he abandoned her.) The lyrics refer to struggles on the road balancing her job and being a mother, her friends made in other towns and moving ahead from hard-luck circumstances.

The song's title refers to Jones's sister.

Critical reception
An uncredited review of the song in the Gavin Report said that the song was "a raunchy Country hard-luck story. But the feel is up, positive and rockin'."

Charts

References

1987 songs
1987 debut singles
David Lynn Jones songs
Mercury Records singles
Songs about truck driving
Songs with feminist themes
Songs about siblings